Artemisia herba-alba, the white wormwood, is a perennial shrub in the genus Artemisia that grows commonly on the dry steppes of the Mediterranean regions in Northern Africa (Saharan Maghreb), Western Asia (Arabian Peninsula) and Southwestern Europe. It is used as an antiseptic and antispasmodic in herbal medicine.

Names
Its specific epithet herba-alba means "white herb" in Latin, as its stems and leaves are white and woolly. 

"Wormwood" (in the Bible, Rev. 8:10–11).

Botanical description
Leaves are strongly aromatic and covered with fine glandular hairs that reflect sunlight giving a grayish aspect to the shrub. The leaves of sterile shoots are grey, petiolate, ovate to orbicular in outline; whereas, the leaves of flowering stems, more abundant in winter, are much smaller.

The flowering heads are sessile, oblong and tapering at base. The plant flowers from September to December. The receptacle is naked with 2–5 yellowish hermaphrodite flowers per head.

Phytochemistry
Essential oil of A. herba-alba, from the Sinai Desert, contains mainly 1,8-cineole and appreciable amounts of α- / β-thujone as well as other oxygenated monoterpenes including terpinen-4-ol, camphor and borneol. Davanone, chrysanthenone and cis-chrysanthenol have been described as major constituents in some populations of A. herba-alba from Morocco and Spain. Less common non-head-to-tail monoterpene alcohols have been identified in some populations from Negev desert, such as santolina alcohol and yomogi alcohol.

Several sesquiterpene lactones were found in the aerial parts of A. herba-alba. Mainly, eudesmanolides and germacranolides types were reported in most cases. A variety of flavonoids were also described mainly with methylated (i.e. patuletin) and O-methylated (i.e. hispidulin, cirsilineol) aglycones. The presence of C-glycosides (i.e. isovitexin, schaftoside, isoschaftoside) is also noticeable.

Uses
Artemisia herba-alba is good fodder for grazing animals, mainly sheep, and in the Algerian steppes cattle.

Herbal medicine

This species of sagebrush is widely used in herbal medicine for its antiseptic, vermifuge and antispasmodic properties. Artemisia herba-alba was reported as a traditional remedy of enteritis, and various intestinal disturbances, among the Bedouins in the Negev desert. Based on laboratory assays, essential oil showed antibacterial activity, as well as, antispasmodic activity on rabbits and cytotoxic effect on cancer cells.

Artemisia herba-alba based teas were used in Iraqi folk medicine for the treatment of diabetes mellitus. An aqueous extract of aerial parts of the plant has shown a hypoglycemic effect in alloxan-induced diabetic rabbits and mice.

Culture
Artemisia herba-alba is thought to be the plant translated as "wormwood" in English-language versions of the Bible (apsinthos in the Greek text).
Wormwood is mentioned seven times in the Jewish Bible, always with the implication of bitterness.  Wormwood is mentioned once in the New Testament, as the name of a star, also with implications of bitterness.

References

External links

Details for: Artemisia herba-alba – The Euro+Med Plantbase. – Retrieved 19 February 2010.
Sahara-Nature: Artemisia herba-alba -Retrieved 19 February 2010. 

herba-alba
Flora of North Africa
Flora of Western Asia
Medicinal plants of Africa
Medicinal plants of Asia
Medicinal plants of Europe
Plants described in 1779
Taxa named by Ignacio Jordán Claudio de Asso y del Río
Flora of the Mediterranean Basin